Sarah Francesca "Sally" Mugabe (née Hayfron; 6 June 1931 – 27 January 1992) was the first wife of Robert Mugabe (former President of Zimbabwe) and the First Lady of Zimbabwe from 1987 until her death in 1992. She was popularly known as Amai (Mother) in Zimbabwe.

Early life
Born Sarah Francesca Hayfron in 1931 in the Gold Coast (present-day Ghana), then a British colony. Sally and her twin sister, Esther were raised in a political family which was part of the growing nationalist politics in the colonial Gold Coast. She went to Achimota School, then went on to university to study before qualifying as a teacher.

She met her future husband, Robert Mugabe, in the Gold Coast at Takoradi Teacher Training College where they were both teaching, and went with him to Southern Rhodesia, where they were married in April 1961 in Salisbury.

Exile and family

A trained teacher who asserted her position as an independent political activist and campaigner, Hayfron demonstrated this activism as early as 1962 when she was active in mobilising African women to challenge the Southern Rhodesian constitution.  She was charged with sedition and sentenced to five years imprisonment. Part of the sentence was suspended.

In 1967, Sally went into exile in London, and resided in Ealing, West London; her stay in Britain was financed, at least in part, by the British Ariel Foundation. This was a charity founded in 1960. She spent the next eight years agitating and campaigning for the release of political detainees in Rhodesia, including her husband who had been arrested in 1964 and was to remain incarcerated for ten years. Their only son, Nhamodzenyika, who was born in 1963 during this period of detention and imprisonment, would succumb to a severe attack of malaria and die in Ghana in 1966. Mugabe was prevented from attending the burial of his son. Her father died in 1970.

The British Home Office attempted to deport her in 1970, but after her husband, still in prison, petitioned the British Prime Minister, Harold Wilson, and the Foreign and Commonwealth Office, she was given British residency. Her case for residency was supported by two British Government ministers in particular: Labour MP Maurice Foley, and the Conservative peer Lord Lothian.

With Robert Mugabe's release in 1975 and subsequent departure for Mozambique with Edgar Tekere, Sally rejoined her husband in Maputo. Here, she cast herself in the new role of a mother figure to the thousands of refugees created by the Rhodesian Bush War. This earned her the popular title Amai (Mother).

Return to politics

In 1978, she was elected ZANU-PF Deputy Secretary for the Women's League.
In 1980 she had to make a quick adjustment to a new and national role of the wife of Zimbabwe's first black Prime Minister. She officially became the First Lady of Zimbabwe in 1987 when her husband became the second President of Zimbabwe. She was elected Secretary General of the ZANU-PF Women's League at the Party's Congress of 1989.

She also founded the Zimbabwe Child Survival Movement. Sally Mugabe launched the Zimbabwe Women's Cooperative in the UK in 1986 and supported Akina Mama wa Afrika, a London-based African women's organisation focusing on development and women's issues in Africa and the United Kingdom.

Death and remembrance

Sally Mugabe died on 27 January 1992 of kidney failure. Upon her death, she was interred at the National Heroes Acre in Harare, Zimbabwe. In 2002, to mark the 10th anniversary of her death, Zimbabwe issued a set of five postage stamps of a common design using two different photographs, each photograph appearing on two of the denominations. She is remembered fondly with love and affection, as she is still considered the founding mother of the nation of Zimbabwe.

References

External links

1931 births
1992 deaths
Deaths from kidney failure
Zimbabwean educators
Alumni of Achimota School
First Ladies of Zimbabwe
ZANU–PF politicians
Zimbabwean twins
Ghanaian emigrants to Zimbabwe
Sally